Daegu National Museum is a national museum located in Hwanggeum-dong, Suseong-gu, Daegu, South Korea. It opened on December 7, 1994, and holds approximately 30,000 artifacts. Its main collection consists of archaeological objects from Daegu and Gyeongsangbuk-do region.

The museum was built as a cultural facility to research, preserve, exhibit and educate visitors on the cultural heritage of Daegu and Gyeongsangbuk-do. On July 19, 2010, the Ancient Culture Hall, the Medieval Culture Hall, and the Textiles and Clothing Hall were opened to the public.

See also
List of museums in South Korea

References

Further reading

External links 
 
 

National museums of South Korea
Museums in Daegu
Archaeological museums in South Korea
Suseong District